St. John's Parish Church in Barbados is the first church of St. John that is presumed to have been a simple wooden building, but its date is unknown.  The parish along with St. George, was carved out of St. Michael in 1640–1641.  But successive churches were badly damaged by the hurricane of 1675, the Great Hurricane of 1780, and finally destroyed by the 1831 Barbados–Louisiana hurricane. The present church building (the fifth) was built is 1836, and the chancel added in 1876.  It is the prototype of the restrained Barbadian version of the Gothic parish church, and a beautiful Westmacott sculpture, commemorating Elizabeth Pinder, on the left of the main door.

Religious buildings and structures in Barbados
Saint John, Barbados